Christianity is the second major population in Niger State Nigeria, where Sharia is valid. Nine churches in Kontagora were set ablaze in 2006. Minna has a Living Faith Church, a Grace Baptist Church, Victory Christian Church and The Apostolic Church.
The Church of Christ in Nigeria is present in the state. A bomb attack allegedly by Boko Haram killed three persons in All Christian-Fellowship Mission in Suleja, Niger State on July 10, 2011. Muslim Rights Concern has condemned this. Churches in Minna and Gwada have been burned, too. Faith Mission Church is present in the state. A Roman Catholic Diocese of Minna has its seat in the state and decidedly is a minority within its area. Evangelical Church Winning All is present in Madalla. 
The Evangelical Missionary Society used to be active in the area of Niger State.

See also 

Christianity in Adamawa State
Christianity in Borno State
Christianity in Jigawa State
Christianity in Kaduna State
Christianity in Kano State
Christianity in Katsina State
Christianity in Kebbi State
Christianity in Kwara State
Christianity in Ogun State
Christianity in Osun State
Christianity in Sokoto State
Christianity in Yobe State

Islam in Nigeria
National Church of Nigeria
Nigerian sectarian violence
Protestantism in Nigeria
Roman Catholicism in Nigeria

References

Niger State
Niger